Marinococcus halotolerans is a Gram-positive and aerobic bacterium from the genus of Marinococcus which has been isolated from soil from Qinghai in China.

References

 

Bacillaceae
Bacteria described in 2005